This is a list of Turkish television related events from 2011.

Events
13 February - The 2002 Miss World Azra Akın and her partner Nikolay Monolov win the first season of Yok Böyle Dans.

Debuts
10 October - O Ses Türkiye (2011–present)

Television shows

Ending this year

Births

Deaths

See also
2011 in Turkey

References